Aaron Remana Hopa (13 November 1971 – 8 December 1998) was a New Zealand international rugby union player whose career was cut short when he died in a diving accident at sea.

Early life
Hopa was born in 1971 in Hamilton, Waikato, a precinct of New Zealand's north island.

Career
He was an All Black in 1997 and played four matches on that year's tour of Britain and Ireland. He played for Waikato at provincial level including the Ranfurly Shield winning team in 1997 and he also played for the Chiefs in the Super 12. Hopa was outstanding in his position of loose forward.

Death
In 1998, Hopa drowned in an accident while on a diving expedition near Slipper Island, off the Coromandel Peninsula coast of Waikato. He was 27.

References

External links 

1971 births
1998 deaths
New Zealand rugby union players
New Zealand international rugby union players
Rugby union players from Hamilton, New Zealand
Waikato rugby union players
Chiefs (rugby union) players
Underwater diving deaths